Kottangal is a small village in Mallappally Taluk of Pathanamthitta District in India. River Manimala flows through the boundary of Kottangal Panchayath which separates it from Kottayam District.  Kottangal Devi Temple is situated in near Mallappally and is dedicated to goddess Bhadrakali. Temple has a history of about 1500 years with the famed Padayani held annually. "Orakkanpaara" is an unexplored scenic spot with a beautiful waterfall in Kottangal Panchayath which is famous for waterfall and spending holiday time for family and friends. "Nagappaara" is also an unexplored place in the Kottangal Panchayath. It is located about 3km from Maramkulam (chunkappara-perumpetty road). It is explored and famous for a picnic spot in Pathanamthitta district. Nagappaara is located on the border of Pothen puzha forest division.

Kottangal Padayani
Kottangal Padayani is performed along with the 8 (Ettu padayani) days from a total of 28 days during January - February (Makara Bharani). This is performed every year at Kottangal Devi Temple located in the boundary of Kottayam and Pathanamthitta Districts. The last 8 days are important with the performance of different Kolams and other traditional programs.

The padayani is done by two karas (areas which contains different sub areas) Kottangal and Kulathoor. The last 8 days are equally divided into two karas that is 4 for each. The last two days (valiya Padayani) are most important for both Karas and they conduct programs in a competitive manner. Beautiful processions will be there on the evening of last two days. The main programs include vela Kali, Adavi, Pallippana, Vellam Kudi, vinodam and kolam Thullal. The kolams performed in the padayani are Ganapathi Kolam, Kuthira, Bhairavi, Sundara Yakshi, Araki Yakshi, Marutha, Pakshi, Kalamadan and Kalan Kolam.

References 

Villages in Pathanamthitta district